The electoral district of Malvern is an electorate of the Victorian Legislative Assembly. It contains the suburbs of Malvern, Armadale, Kooyong, Malvern East, Toorak, and parts of Glen Iris.

The electorate has been held by the Liberal Party (or its predecessor) since its creation in 1945, and for most of that time has been regarded as one of the Liberal Party's safest seats in Melbourne. In all but one election, the Liberals have won enough votes on the first count to win the seat outright. As a measure of how safe Malvern is for the Liberals, Opposition Leader Robert Doyle easily retained the seat with 60.2 percent of the two-party vote even as Labor won its biggest majority ever at the state level.

The current member is Michael O'Brien, who succeeded Doyle at the 2006 Victorian election and served as Treasurer in the Napthine government. At the 2014 State election, O'Brien's margin over Labor was 16.3%, down from 20.6%, but his margin was reduced to 6.1% at the 2018 State election. On 6 December 2018 O’Brien was elected leader of the Liberal Party and became Opposition Leader, a role he served until September 2021.

The seat's best-known member was Lindsay Thompson, who served as Premier of Victoria from 1981 to 1982 and served as a minister without interruption from 1958 to 1982 – one of the longest-serving state ministers in Australian history.

Members for Malvern

Oldham represented Boroondara 1933–1945

Election results

References

External links
 Malvern District Profile – Victorian Electoral Commission

Electoral districts of Victoria (Australia)
1945 establishments in Australia
City of Stonnington
Electoral districts and divisions of Greater Melbourne